The 1975–76 Indiana Pacers season was Indiana's ninth season and last in the American Basketball Association (ABA).

ABA Draft

Roster

Season standings

Player stats
Note: PG= per game; M= Minutes; R= Rebounds; A= Assists; S = Steals; B = Blocks; P = Points; t = Turnovers; PF = Personal fouls

Playoffs
Quarterfinals

Pacers lose series, 2–1

Awards, records, and honors
Don Buse led the ABA in minutes played (3380), steals (346), assists (689), minutes per game average (40.2), assists per game (8.2), and steals per game (4.1)
Bill Keller led ABA in 3-point field goal attempted (349) and made (123).
Billy Knight was the ABA's second leading scorer (28.1)

ABA All-Stars
Don Buse
Billy Knight

References

External links
RememberTheABA.com 1975-76 regular season and playoff results

Indiana
Indiana Pacers seasons
Indiana Pacers
Indiana Pacers